"When the Sun Goes Down in Romany: My Heart Goes Roaming Back to You" is a World War I song written by Sam M. Lewis and Joe Young and composed by Bert Grant. This song was first published in 1916 by Waterson, Berlin & Snyder, Co. in New York City.

The sheet music can be found at the Pritzker Military Museum & Library.

References 

Bibliography

1916 songs
Songs about France
Songs of World War I
Songs with lyrics by Joe Young (lyricist)
Songs with lyrics by Sam M. Lewis
Songs with music by Bert Grant